Georg Friedrich Ferdinand Prinz von Preussen (born 10 June 1976) is a German businessman who is the current head of the Prussian branch of the House of Hohenzollern, the former ruling dynasty of the German Empire and of the Kingdom of Prussia. He is the great-great-grandson and historic heir of Wilhelm II, the last German Emperor and King of Prussia, who abdicated and went into exile upon Germany's defeat in World War I in 1918. Thus he is a fourth great-grandson of Queen Victoria of the United Kingdom and a distant cousin of many European monarchs.

Education and career
Georg Friedrich is the only son of Prince Louis Ferdinand of Prussia (1944–1977) and Countess Donata of Castell-Rüdenhausen (1950–2015). Born into a mediatised princely family, his mother later became Duchess Donata of Oldenburg when she married secondly Duke Friedrich August of Oldenburg, who had previously been married to her sister-in-law Princess Marie Cécile of Prussia. His only sister is Cornelie-Cécile (b. 1978).

He attended grammar schools in Bremen and Oldenburg and completed his education at Glenalmond College near Perth, Scotland, where he passed his A-levels. Georg Friedrich earned his degree in business economics at the Freiberg University of Mining and Technology.

Georg Friedrich works for a company specialising in helping universities to bring their innovations to market. He also administered the Princess Kira of Prussia Foundation, founded by his grandmother Grand Duchess Kira of Russia in 1952, now administered by his wife. In 2018 he moved from a house near Bremen, where he had also spent his childhood, to Babelsberg, a district of Potsdam, the capital city of the German state of Brandenburg.

He owns a two-thirds share of his family's original seat, Hohenzollern Castle, while the other share is held by the head of the Swabian branch, Karl Friedrich, Prince of Hohenzollern. In 2017 he founded a beer trademark called  (Royal Prussian Beer Manufactory) producing a Pilsner brand called .

Prince Georg Friedrich continues to claim compensation for land and palaces in Berlin expropriated from his family, a claim begun in March 1991 by his grandfather Prince Louis Ferdinand of Prussia under the Compensation Act (EALG).

House of Hohenzollern
Georg Friedrich succeeded his grandfather, Louis Ferdinand, as Head of the Royal House of Prussia, a branch of the House of Hohenzollern, on 26 September 1994. He stated that he learned to appreciate the history and responsibility of his heritage during time spent with his paternal grandfather, who often recounted to him anecdotes from the life in exile of his own grandfather, the last German Kaiser, Wilhelm II.

His position as sole heir to the estate of his grandfather was challenged by his uncles, Friedrich Wilhelm and Michael, who filed a lawsuit claiming that, despite their renunciations as dynasts at the time of their marriages, the loss of their inheritance rights based on their selection of spouse was discriminatory and unconstitutional. His uncles were initially successful, the Regional Court of Hechingen and the higher Regional Court of Stuttgart ruling in their favour in 1997 on the grounds that the requirement to marry equally was "immoral". However, the Federal Court of Justice of Germany overturned the original rulings in favour of Georg Friedrich's uncles, the case being remanded to the courts at Hechingen and Stuttgart. This time both courts ruled in favour of Georg Friedrich. His uncles then took their case to the Federal Constitutional Court of Germany which overruled the previous court rulings in Georg Friedrich's favour. On 19 October 2005, a German regional court ruled that Georg Friedrich was indeed the principal heir of his grandfather, Louis Ferdinand (who was the primary beneficiary of the trust set up for the estate of Wilhelm II), but also concluded that each of the children of Louis Ferdinand was entitled to a portion of the Prussian inheritance.

Family

In 2011 Georg Friedrich married Princess Sophie of Isenburg. The civil wedding took place in Potsdam on 25 August 2011, and the ecumenical religious wedding took place at the Church of Peace in Potsdam on 27 August 2011, in commemoration of the 950th anniversary of the founding of the House of Hohenzollern. The religious wedding was also broadcast live by local public television. 

On 20 January 2013, Georg Friedrich's wife, Sophie, gave birth to twin sons in Bremen, Carl Friedrich Franz Alexander and Louis Ferdinand Christian Albrecht. Carl Friedrich, the elder of the two, is his father's heir apparent. Their third child, Emma Marie Charlotte Sofia, was born on 2 April 2015. On 17 November 2016, Sophie gave birth to Heinrich Albert Johann Georg, their fourth child.

Property claims 
In mid-2019 it was revealed that Georg Friedrich had filed claims for permanent right of residency for his family in Cecilienhof, or one of two other former Hohenzollern palaces in Potsdam, as well as return of the family library, 266 paintings, an imperial crown and sceptre, and the letters of Empress Augusta Victoria. This sparked a public debate about the legitimacy of these claims and the role of the Hohenzollern during and before the Nazi regime in Germany, specifically Crown Prince Wilhelm's involvement.

In June 2019, a claim made by Georg Friedrich that Rheinfels Castle be returned to the Hohenzollern family was dismissed by a court. In 1924, the ruined castle had been given to the town of St Goar, under the proviso it was not sold. In 1998 the town leased the ruins to a nearby hotel. His case made the claim that this constituted a breach of the bequest.

Ancestry

References

External links

 Official (English-language) website of the House of Hohenzollern
 Biography at preussen.de
 "No Titles, No Subjects, No Problem: Germans Join Royal Wedding Craze", The Wall Street Journal, 26 Aug 2011
 Wedding video

House of Hohenzollern
Pretenders to the German throne
Prussian princes
German Christians
1976 births
Living people
People educated at Glenalmond College
Businesspeople from Bremen